Hänt Extra is a Swedish language weekly celebrity and youth magazine published by Aller Media in Stockholm, Sweden.

History and profile
Hänt Extra was established in 1986. The magazine is part of Aller Media. It is published by Aller Media AB and is based in Stockholm. Bo Liljeberg is the editor-in-chief of the magazine.

The circulation of Hänt Extra was 129,000 copies in 2007. The magazine had a circulation of 120,700 copies in 2014.

See also

 List of magazines in Sweden

References

1986 establishments in Sweden
Celebrity magazines
Magazines established in 1986
Magazines published in Stockholm
Swedish-language magazines
Weekly magazines published in Sweden
Youth magazines